The QN Signals are Morse code operating signals that were introduced for Amateur radio net operation  in 1939 on the Michigan QMN Net to lighten the burdens of net control operators. Originally created by a committee of the Detroit Amateur Radio Association led by Ralph Thetreat, W8FX. Ev Battey W1UE (W4IA-SK), then ARRL assistant communications manager, later printed them in QST.

The QN Signals are defined in ARRL document FSD-218 and listed in the ARRL Operating Manual.

Although these codes are within the Aeronautical Code signals range (QAA–QNZ) and thus conflict with official international Q signals beginning with QN, the ARRL informally queried FCC's legal branch about the conflict.

ARRL QN Signals For CW Net Use 

* QN-codes marked with an asterisk (*) are only for use by the Net Control Station.

See also 
 ACP-131
 ARRL
 Brevity code
 Morse code
 National Traffic System
 Prosigns for Morse code
 Q code
 Z code

References 

Operating signals
Encodings
Morse code
Amateur radio